Yap Speech Cloud was a multimodal speech recognition system developed by American technology company Yap Inc. It offered a fully cloud-based speech-to-text transcription platform that was used by customers such as Microsoft.

The Company was a contestant at the inaugural TechCrunch conference and was subsequently acquired by Amazon in September 2011 to help develop products such as Alexa Voice Service, Echo, and Fire TV.

See also
List of speech recognition software

References

2006 establishments in North Carolina
Amazon (company)
Amazon (company) acquisitions
American companies established in 2006
Companies based in Charlotte, North Carolina
Software companies established in 2006
Multimodal interaction
Software companies based in North Carolina
Speech recognition
Technology companies disestablished in 2011
Technology companies established in 2006
Defunct technology companies of the United States
Defunct telecommunications companies of the United States
Defunct software companies of the United States